Hasköy may refer to the following places in Turkey:

 Hasköy, Istanbul, a quarter or neighborhood of the district of Beyoğlu in Istanbul
 Hasköy, Ardahan, a village in the district of Ardahan, Ardahan Province
 Hasköy, Çınar
 Hasköy, Enez
 Hasköy, Havsa
 Hasköy, Kahta, a village in the district of Kahta, Adıyaman Province
 Hasköy, Muş, a town and district of Muş Province
 Hasköy, Nazilli, a village in the district of Nazilli, Aydın Province
 Hasköy, Sarayköy

Hasköy is also the Turkish name for Haskovo, when Bulgaria was under Ottoman rule